Uncle Tom's Cabin is a 1965 German film directed by Géza von Radványi. The film was entered into the 4th Moscow International Film Festival. It is based on the novel Uncle Tom's Cabin.

In the early spring of 1977, the film was reissued in the United States in an edited form, with new scenes directed by Al Adamson. On the heels of the success that year of the miniseries Roots, the ad campaign for the reissue touted that the film had "ALL the SENSUAL and VIOLENT passions 'ROOTS' couldn't show on TV" and offered "the REAL story of the SLAVES, MASTERS & LOVERS."

Cast

Reception

Box office
In France, it was the 63rd top-grossing film of 1965, selling 928,110 tickets at the box office.  In Poland, it sold more than  tickets, making it one of the thirteen highest-grossing foreign films in Poland . In North America, where it initially released in 1969, the film went on to sell 7,042,254 tickets and gross . This adds up to more than 9,970,364 tickets sold worldwide.

Critical response
Reviewing its 1977 reissue, Gene Siskel of the Chicago Tribune called the film "lousy", and, noting the comparisons its ad campaign made to Roots, remarked that "the only similarity is that both films contain scenes of slaves being whipped."

See also
List of films featuring slavery

References

External links
 

1965 films
1965 drama films
1960s historical drama films
German historical drama films
French historical drama films
Italian historical drama films
Yugoslav historical drama films
West German films
1960s German-language films
Films directed by Géza von Radványi
Films based on works by Harriet Beecher Stowe
Films about American slavery
Films set in the 1840s
Films set in the 1850s
Films about Quakers
Films based on American novels
Uncle Tom's Cabin
1960s German films
1960s Italian films
1960s French films